Melanie F. Sachs is an American politician and social worker serving as a member of the Maine House of Representatives from the 48th district. She assumed office on December 2, 2020.

Early life and education 
Sachs was born in Morristown, New Jersey and raised in New Sharon, Maine. After graduating from Mt. Blue High School, she earned a Bachelor of Arts degree in political science from Bates College and a Master of Science degree in science and social administration from Case Western Reserve University.

Career 
Prior to her career in politics, Sachs was a social worker in Maine. She has worked as the executive director of Freeport Community Services and Sexual Assault Response Services of Southern Maine. She was also a member of the Freeport Town Council. Sachs was elected to the Maine House of Representatives in 2020. She assumed office on December 2, 2020, succeeding former speaker Sara Gideon.

References 

Living people
Year of birth missing (living people)
People from Morristown, New Jersey
People from New Sharon, Maine
Bates College alumni
Case Western Reserve University alumni
American social workers
Democratic Party members of the Maine House of Representatives
Women state legislators in Maine
People from Freeport, Maine